Ryan Andrew Kidd (born 6 October 1971) is an English former footballer who is now a youth-team coach at Blackburn Rovers.

A defender, he left Port Vale in 1992 and then spent ten years with Preston North End, before retiring from the game at age 30 due to injury. During his time at the club, Preston won promotion as Third Division champions in 1995–96 and Second Division champions in 1999–2000; and were one game away from promotion to the Premier League in 2001. He turned to coaching once his playing days finished, and was briefly the manager of Darlington in June 2010. He went on to coach at Bury, and was temporarily appointed joint caretaker-manager (with Chris Brass) in November 2016.

Playing career

Port Vale
Kidd graduated through the Port Vale youth team to sign his first professional forms under John Rudge in July 1990. He made one league start and three cup appearances as a substitute in the 1991–92 season, but was given a free transfer in May 1992 and moved on to Les Chapman's Preston North End, also of the Second Division.

Preston North End
The "Lilywhites" were relegated into the Third Division (fourth tier) under new manager John Beck in 1992–93; they occupied the final relegation place having finished three points below Hull City. Preston then finished fifth in 1993–94, and reached the Wembley play-off Final, where they lost out 4–2 to Wycombe Wanderers. They again finished fifth in 1994–95, with the help of young Manchester United loanee David Beckham, but missed out on the 1995 play-off Final after they lost out to Bury at the semi-final stage. North End achieved promotion at the third time, winning the Third Division title in 1995–96 by a three-point margin, under Gary Peters' stewardship.

Kidd was a key first team member in 1996–97, making 40 appearances as Preston retained their third tier status. They achieved another comfortable mid-table in 1997–98, and Kidd played 44 games, scoring in wins over Wigan Athletic and Luton Town, and retaining his first team place under teammate turned manager David Moyes. For the third time in Kidd's Preston career, the Deepdale club reached the play-offs in 1998–99 following a fifth-place finish; however they missed the play-off Final with Manchester City after losing out to Gillingham at the semi-final stage. Kidd had played 33 games over the course of the campaign, scoring at Wrexham and in both games against Chesterfield. Preston continued to progress, and won promotion as champions in 1999–2000, finishing seven points ahead of second-place Burnley; Kidd played a total of 38 games.

He played just fifteen First Division games in 2000–01 after recovering from serious neck surgery, but played every minute of the three play-off games. Preston progressed past Birmingham City following a penalty shoot-out, but were denied a place in the Premier League after a 3–0 defeat to Bolton Wanderers in the Final at the Millennium Stadium. He was limited to just seven appearances in 2001–02, before he was forced to retire in November 2001, after suffering a serious neck injury (a collapsed disc meant he could not safely head the ball again). For his ten years service and more than 300 league and cup appearances for the "Lilywhites", Kidd was granted a testimonial match in summer 2002 against Kevin Keegan's Manchester City.

Coaching career
Kidd joined Barnsley in January 2006, where he was the assistant to manager Simon Davey as the club reached the FA Cup semi-finals at Wembley in 2008, having knocked out Liverpool at Anfield, then beating Chelsea at home in the quarter finals. Previously he had gained his coaching and managerial experiences working as Development Centre Manager and under-18 team coach at Preston North End, before taking up the offer of Centre of Excellence Manager at Bury. He left Barnsley in September 2009 after almost three years, following the sacking of Simon Davey.

In March 2010, Davey and Kidd again teamed up to take over at League Two side Darlington. Davey resigned after just eleven weeks, and on 17 June 2010 Kidd took over as manager of Darlington. He signed a two-year contract, however he lasted just eleven days, resigning on 28 June without taking charge of a first-team game and making no signings, after he had second thoughts about the job. On 21 December 2011, Kidd was named as assistant to Rochdale's caretaker manager Chris Beech. He later began coaching the under-16s at the Blackpool academy.

In February 2014, Kidd was appointed as the under-18's manager at Bury. Kidd and Chris Brass took charge of the club as joint caretaker-managers following the sacking of David Flitcroft in November 2016, and were given the task of managing the club for the rest of the 2016–17 season. The club lost all four games before Brass was given the job on a full-time basis, with Kidd being appointed as his assistant. He remained at Gigg Lane under three different managers since Brass left in February 2017, and served the club as the youth-team manager in the 2018–19 season, working with Mark Litherland. Following the demise of Bury, Kidd moved on to become the under-18 assistant coach at Blackburn Rovers in October 2019.

Personal life
As of November 2016, Kidd was married to Mirinda, with whom he had two sons.

Career statistics

Playing statistics
Source:

Honours
Preston North End
Football League Third Division: 1995–96
Football League Second Division: 1999–2000

References

1971 births
Living people
People from Radcliffe, Greater Manchester
English footballers
English football managers
Association football defenders
Port Vale F.C. players
Preston North End F.C. players
English Football League players
Darlington F.C. managers
Bury F.C. managers
National League (English football) managers
English Football League managers
Association football coaches
Preston North End F.C. non-playing staff
Barnsley F.C. non-playing staff
Rochdale A.F.C. non-playing staff
Blackpool F.C. non-playing staff
Bury F.C. non-playing staff
Blackburn Rovers F.C. non-playing staff